Winn Parish is a parish located in the U.S. state of Louisiana. As of the 2020 census, the population was 13,755. Its seat is Winnfield. The parish was founded in 1852. It is last in alphabetical order of Louisiana's sixty-four parishes.

Winn is separated from Natchitoches Parish along U.S. Highway 71 by Saline Bayou, the first blackwater protected waterway in the American South.

History
Winn Parish was established in 1852 from lands which had belonged to the parishes of Catahoula, Natchitoches, and Rapides.

During the Civil War, David Pierson, a young attorney, was elected to represent the parish at the Secession Convention called in January 1861 in Baton Rouge by Governor Thomas Overton Moore. Pierson voted against secession and refused, along with several others, to change his "no" vote at the end of the process when asked to do so to make the final tally unanimous.

That these conscripts refused to fight for the Confederacy is understandable considering that Union support was higher in north Louisiana, and especially high in Winn Parish. The Confederate States Army defeated a Union detachment sent to destroy a salt works in the parish. Winn Parish contributed to the $80,000 raised to build fortifications on the nearby Red River.

After the war, bandits roamed the Natchez Trace or Harrisonburg Road that ran through the lower part of the parish. Among the worst were the West and Kimbrell clan. For seven years they preyed especially on travelers and migrants passing through the area.

In April 1873, white Democrats forming a militia from Winn Parish joined with ex-Confederate veterans from Rapides and Grant parishes against Republican blacks in the Colfax massacre in neighboring Grant Parish. They attacked freedmen defending the parish courthouse and two Republican officeholders in the aftermath to the disputed gubernatorial election of 1872. Among the 80–150 blacks killed were at least 50 who had surrendered; a total of three white men were killed in the confrontation.

Geography

Major highways

  U.S. Highway 71
  U.S. Highway 84
  U.S. Highway 167
  Louisiana Highway 34
  Louisiana Highway 126
  Louisiana Highway 127
  Louisiana Highway 156
  Louisiana Highway 471
  Louisiana Highway 499
  Louisiana Highway 500
  Louisiana Highway 501
  Louisiana Highway 505
  Louisiana Highway 1228

Adjacent parishes
 Jackson Parish (north)
 Caldwell Parish (northeast)
 La Salle Parish (southeast)
 Grant Parish (south)
 Natchitoches Parish (west)
 Bienville Parish (northwest)

National protected area
 Kisatchie National Forest (part)
 Saline Bayou

Demographics

2020 census

As of the 2020 United States census, there were 13,755 people, 5,483 households, and 3,661 families residing in the parish.

2000 census
As of the census of 2000, there were 16,894 people, 5,930 households, and 4,234 families residing in the parish.  The population density was 18 people per square mile (7/km2).  There were 7,502 housing units at an average density of 8 per square mile (3/km2).  The racial makeup of the parish was 66.27% White, 32.03% Black or African American, 0.50% Native American, 0.16% Asian, 0.05% Pacific Islander, 0.13% from other races, and 0.86% from two or more races.  0.87% of the population were Hispanic or Latino of any race. 35.9% were of American, 7.2% Irish and 4.9% English ancestry according to Census 2000.

There were 5,930 households, out of which 32.60% had children under the age of 18 living with them, 51.80% were married couples living together, 15.30% had a female householder with no husband present, and 28.60% were non-families. 26.20% of all households were made up of individuals, and 12.90% had someone living alone who was 65 years of age or older.  The average household size was 2.55 and the average family size was 3.07.

In the parish the population was spread out, with 24.80% under the age of 18, 9.60% from 18 to 24, 28.90% from 25 to 44, 22.70% from 45 to 64, and 14.00% who were 65 years of age or older.  The median age was 36 years. For every 100 females there were 110.80 males.  For every 100 females age 18 and over, there were 113.20 males.

The median income for a household in the parish was $25,462, and the median income for a family was $31,513. Males had a median income of $29,094 versus $17,939 for females. The per capita income for the parish was $11,794.  About 17.00% of families and 21.50% of the population were below the poverty line, including 28.40% of those under age 18 and 24.20% of those age 65 or over.

Education
Winn Parish School Board operates local public schools in all of the county.

Corrections
Winn Correctional Center is in an unincorporated section of Winn Parish. Corrections Corporation of America, under contract with Louisiana Department of Public Safety and Corrections, once operated the prison.

National Guard
"A" Company of the Louisiana National Guard 199th Forward Support Battalion was previously located in Winnfield, Louisiana. The unit deployed twice to Iraq as part of the 256TH IBCT in 2004-5 and 2010. The unit's Winnfield Armory was closed.

Communities

City 
 Winnfield (parish seat and largest municipality)

Town 
 Tullos (partial)

Villages
 Atlanta
 Calvin
 Dodson
 Sikes

Census-designated places 
 Jordan Hill
 Joyce
 Saint Maurice

Unincorporated communities
 Packton
 Tannehill
 Wheeling

Hospital
 Winn Parish Medical Center

Politics

Notable people
 Morris N. Abrams, educator
 O.K. Allen, governor of Louisiana
 Bryant W. Bailey, politician, Winn Parish sheriff from 1908 to 1912
 William C. Edenborn, inventor and industrialist
 T. H. Harris, Louisiana state superintendent of education from 1908 to 1940
 Huey Long, governor of Louisiana
 Earl Kemp Long, governor of Louisiana
 Charlton Lyons, Republican candidate for governor in 1964, practiced law in Winnfield prior to 1930
 Keith M. Pyburn, state representative for Caddo Parish from 1948 to 1952; born and resided in Dodson in Winn Parish from 1910 to 1925
 Terry Reeves, district attorney for Winn Parish from 1991 until his death in office in 2005
 Calvin Marion Robinson, sheriff of Winn Parish prior to 1956
 Roy Sanders, educator and state representative from Natchitoches Parish from 1948 to 1952; born in Winn Parish

See also

 National Register of Historic Places listings in Winn Parish, Louisiana

References

 
Louisiana parishes
1852 establishments in Louisiana
Populated places established in 1852